Księżyce  is a village in the administrative district of Gmina Wiązów, within Strzelin County, Lower Silesian Voivodeship, in south-western Poland. Prior to 1945 it was in Germany.

Administrative Division 
During the years 1975-1998, the town was administratively part of the Wrocław province.

References

Villages in Strzelin County